Christopher Newman (born 18 May 1982) is the coach of the Box Hill Hawks in the Victorian Football League and a former player with the Richmond Football Club in the Australian Football League (AFL). He was drafted at pick 55 in the 2000 national draft from the Dandenong Stingrays in the TAC Cup. Newman grew up in the Melbourne suburb of Narre Warren where his neighbour and childhood friend was former AFL player Brendan Fevola.

Playing career

Early career (2000-2004)
Newman struggled to get himself into the first Richmond side for his first two seasons. He was held back by nagging injuries, which meant he could not get any form.

After a strong run of form for the Coburg Tigers in the VFL, Newman made his debut for Richmond in Round 9 of the 2002 season. He was then to play every game except the Tigers' Round 22 game due to bad form for the previous month. He played every game though in the 2003 season and looked like he might have a career in the big league. He excelled as the Richmond team struggled, kicking 5 goals for the season and averaging 13 disposals off half back. In 2004, he played yet another good year. He played 19 games, once again averaging 13 disposals and also kicking 2 goals.

2005 season
2005 was the break-through year for Newman. As Richmond struggled, Newman was very solid in the heart of their defence. He picked up a career high 24 disposals against Sydney in Round 14, in a stirring one point win over that season's premiers. He averaged 15 disposals for the year after playing every game, and kicked a couple of goals. 
Following the 2005 season, Newman was named in the Australian Squad for the 2005 International Rules Series, and performed well enough in the first test to be named in the bests.

2006 season
2006 was a disappointing season for Newman despite a fairly strong start. After averaging 14 disposals for the first 12 games of the year, things went horribly wrong in round 13 against Collingwood. Newman, in an awkward collision with Leon Davis, broke his leg in two places. This was a similar break to that of fellow Richmond player Nathan Brown in 2005.

2007 season
Newman was able to successfully recover from this horrible break and become one of Richmond's most consistent performers for the year. His run off the half-backline was crucial to the Tigers counter-attacking game plan.

He scored one of the goals of 2007 against Fremantle when he received a 50 m penalty which led him to the centre square after a scuffle with Dean Solomon. Newman kicked a long bomb from the centre square which was going to be the last goal of the 1st quarter. This goal was considered for nomination as one of the "Tiger Treasures of the Century" during Richmond's centenary celebrations in 2008.

2008 season
In 2008, Newman was named as Richmond's Deputy Vice Captain along with Nathan Foley.

His 2008 season was statistically his best to date. He averaged 20.4 disposals per game whilst maintaining a solid level of defensive accountability. He won the Tiger's Most Courageous Player award and also managed a 4th-place finish in the Jack Dyer Medal.

On 19 November 2008, following his strong 2008 season, Newman was named Captain of the Richmond Football Club.

2009-2012: Richmond's captain 
From 2009 to 2012 Chris Newman was Richmond's captain and used as the key defensive playmaker for the Tigers. He is the 39th captain in Richmond's history.

During the 2012 season he played his 200th game against Essendon, but announced that he would resign as captain at the conclusion of the 2012 season.

2014 season
In August 2014, Newman played his 250th AFL game in which the Tigers defeated minor premiers the Sydney Swans by three points to win their ninth consecutive match and clinch the last place in the finals after the club languished in 16th place on the ladder after Round 14. In the lead-up to that match he signed a further contract which meant he would remain at the club until at least the end of the 2015 season.

2015 season
Newman did not have the most successful start to the season and required minor heart surgery two weeks before the season opener against Carlton. There were serious doubts about him playing but the Tigers named him and he played. He announced in August 2015 that he would retire at the end of the season. He played his 268th and final match in a losing elimination final against North Melbourne at the MCG.

Coaching career
On 20 October 2015, Newman joined Hawthorn as a development coach.
In September 2016 it was announced he would move into the head coaching role at the Hawks' VFL affiliate, Box Hill in 2017. He was named the coach of the league's Team of the Year after leading Box Hill to second place in the home and away season in 2017. Newman lead Box Hill to the 2018 VFL premiership.

Playing statistics

|- style="background-color: #EAEAEA"
! scope="row" style="text-align:center" | 2002
|
| 35 || 13 || 0 || 0 || 58 || 38 || 96 || 26 || 19 || 0.0 || 0.0 || 4.5 || 2.9 || 7.4 || 2.0 || 1.5
|-
! scope="row" style="text-align:center" | 2003
|
| 35 || 22 || 5 || 2 || 161 || 130 || 291 || 74 || 43 || 0.2 || 0.1 || 7.3 || 5.9 || 13.2 || 3.4 || 2.0
|- style="background-color: #EAEAEA"
! scope="row" style="text-align:center" | 2004
|
| 35 || 19 || 2 || 4 || 152 || 101 || 253 || 66 || 47 || 0.1 || 0.2 || 8.0 || 5.3 || 13.3 || 3.5 || 2.5
|-
! scope="row" style="text-align:center" | 2005
|
| 35 || 22 || 2 || 3 || 227 || 112 || 339 || 97 || 65 || 0.1 || 0.1 || 10.3 || 5.1 || 15.4 || 4.4 || 3.0
|- style="background-color: #EAEAEA"
! scope="row" style="text-align:center" | 2006
|
| 1 || 13 || 1 || 1 || 125 || 41 || 166 || 54 || 37 || 0.1 || 0.1 || 9.6 || 3.2 || 12.8 || 4.2 || 2.8
|-
! scope="row" style="text-align:center" | 2007
|
| 1 || 22 || 4 || 2 || 272 || 129 || 401 || 138 || 47 || 0.2 || 0.1 || 12.4 || 5.9 || 18.2 || 6.3 || 2.1
|- style="background-color: #EAEAEA"
! scope="row" style="text-align:center" | 2008
|
| 1 || 22 || 3 || 6 || 303 || 146 || 449 || 141 || 44 || 0.1 || 0.3 || 13.8 || 6.6 || 20.4 || 6.4 || 2.0
|-
! scope="row" style="text-align:center" | 2009
|
| 17 || 21 || 3 || 5 || 271 || 165 || 436 || 89 || 67 || 0.1 || 0.2 || 12.9 || 7.9 || 20.8 || 4.2 || 3.2
|- style="background-color: #EAEAEA"
! scope="row" style="text-align:center" | 2010
|
| 17 || 21 || 5 || 3 || 301 || 109 || 410 || 101 || 68 || 0.2 || 0.1 || 14.3 || 5.2 || 19.5 || 4.8 || 3.2
|-
! scope="row" style="text-align:center" | 2011
|
| 17 || 17 || 4 || 3 || 233 || 83 || 316 || 79 || 54 || 0.2 || 0.2 || 13.7 || 4.9 || 18.6 || 4.6 || 3.2
|- style="background-color: #EAEAEA"
! scope="row" style="text-align:center" | 2012
|
| 17 || 22 || 3 || 5 || 252 || 114 || 366 || 114 || 51 || 0.1 || 0.2 || 11.5 || 5.2 || 16.6 || 5.2 || 2.3
|-
! scope="row" style="text-align:center" | 2013
|
| 1 || 19 || 8 || 8 || 198 || 99 || 297 || 98 || 40 || 0.4 || 0.4 || 10.4 || 5.2 || 15.6 || 5.2 || 2.1
|- style="background-color: #EAEAEA"
! scope="row" style="text-align:center" | 2014
|
| 1 || 18 || 4 || 3 || 174 || 68 || 242 || 69 || 45 || 0.2 || 0.2 || 9.7 || 3.8 || 13.4 || 3.8 || 2.5
|-
! scope="row" style="text-align:center" | 2015
|
| 1 || 17 || 12 || 9 || 136 || 74 || 210 || 60 || 40 || 0.7 || 0.5 || 8.0 || 4.4 || 12.4 || 3.5 || 2.4
|- class="sortbottom"
! colspan=3| Career
! 268 !! 56 !! 54 !! 2863 !! 1409 !! 4272 !! 1206 !! 667 !! 0.2 !! 0.2 !! 10.7 !! 5.3 !! 15.9 !! 4.5 !! 2.5
|}

Achievements and honours

Playing honours 
Individual
 Richmond captain: 2009–2012
 Australia international rules football team: 2005
 100 Tiger Treasures "Goal of the Century" nominee: 2008

Coaching honours 
Team
 VFL premiership: 2018

Individual
 VFL coach of the year: 2017

References

External links

 
 Chris Newman (Australian rules footballer)'s statistics from Footy Wire
 

1982 births
Living people
Australian rules footballers from Victoria (Australia)
Richmond Football Club players
Dandenong Stingrays players
Australia international rules football team players
Box Hill Football Club coaches
People from Narre Warren